The 2012 FA WSL is the second season of the FA WSL, the top-level women's football league of England. The season began on 8 April 2012 and was scheduled to end in October 2012. The league is to break between 8 July and 19 August to allow preparation for the 2012 London Olympics.

Arsenal won the competition, their ninth consecutive English title. Entry to the 2013–14 UEFA Women's Champions League was earned by Arsenal, as champions, and Birmingham City, as runners–up.

Teams

League table

Results

Top scorers
Players with at least five goals.

League Cup
To allow for more games the League Cup format was changed from a straight knock-out to a group stage format with the top two advancing to the semi-finals. Arsenal defended their title with a 1–0 win over Birmingham City in a rematch of last year's final. They thus won a double this season of League and League Cup, missing out on the Women's FA Cup.

Group 1

Group 2

Knockout stage

References

External links
Season on soccerway.com

Women's Super League seasons
1
1